Old Permic is a Unicode block containing Old Permic characters for writing the Komi language.

Block

History
The following Unicode-related documents record the purpose and process of defining specific characters in the Old Permic block:

References 

Unicode blocks